"Two Dozen Roses" is a song written by Mac McAnally and Robert Byrne, and recorded by American country music group Shenandoah.  It was released in August 1989 as the fourth single from their album The Road Not Taken.  It was their third number-one hit in both the United States and Canada.

Content
The song's narrator offers hypotheticals to what may have changed his lover's mind about leaving him, such as "two dozen roses" instead of one dozen or "an older bottle of wine;" even going as far as asking "If I really could've hung the moon, would you change your mind?"

Chart performance

Year-end charts

Certifications

References

Shenandoah (band) songs
1989 songs
1989 singles
Songs written by Mac McAnally
Songs written by Robert Byrne (songwriter)
Columbia Records singles